MV Loch Ranza is a Caledonian Maritime Assets Limited ro-ro car ferry, operated by Caledonian MacBrayne, serving the island of Gigha.

History
MV Loch Ranza was the last of four drive-through ferries built in the 1980s by Dunston's of Hessle, to cope with increasing traffic on CalMac's smaller routes.

Layout
They had a second passenger lounge, on the port side, reducing the capacity of the car deck.

Service
MV Loch Ranza replaced  on the Lochranza–Claonaig crossing in April 1987. After only 5 years, she was replaced by the larger . Loch Ranza moved to the Tayinloan–Gigha crossing in July 1992, where she has remained since.

References

Caledonian MacBrayne
1987 ships
Ships built on the Humber